The Sarajevo Music Academy or Music Academy | University of Sarajevo ( or MAS) is a Faculty of Music of University of Sarajevo in Bosnia and Herzegovina.

History 
Sarajevo Music  Academy  was founded by the Decision of the National Assembly of Bosnia and Herzegovina on May 20, 1955 as the fourth such higher education institution in the former joint state, and the first established after the  World War II. This Decision was published in the official Gazette of the People's Republic of Bosnia and Herzegovina No. 12/55, on June 8, 1955. The establishment of the Sarajevo Music  Academy preceded a number of favorable prerequisites, such as the establishment of a network of music schools, the founding of the Sarajevo National Theater, Sarajevo Opera House, Symphony Orchestra RTV Sarajevo, the Institute for the study of folklore and the continuity of the Sarajevo Philharmonic Orchestra.
At the founding of the Academy, the founders of this institution were:
Milenko Živković, rector of the Academy of Music in Belgrade
Dr. Dragotin Cvetko, professor of the Academy of Music (Ljubljana)
Natko Devčić, professor at the Academy of Music, University of Zagreb
Cvjetko Rihtman, director of the Folklore Research Institute in Sarajevo
Miroslav Špiler, professor of the Higher Pedagogical Academy in Sarajevo
Strahinja Dramušić, in front of the Council for Education, Science and Culture of the People's Republic of Bosnia and Herzegovina, as a scorer
After the formation of the first pedagogical core at the Sarajevo Music Academy the first Rector was elected, prof. Cvetko Rihtman. In the first year of the Academy's work, 42 students were enrolled. Teaching at the Sarajevo Music Academy began on 19 December 1955 in seven sections:

I   -  Department of Composition and Conducting
II  -  Department of solo singing
III -  Department of Piano 
IV  -  Department of string Instruments
V   -  Department of wind instruments
VI  -  Department of Musicology
VII -  Theoretical-pedagogical section

The fateful and tragic events that affected the former joint state in the nineties, made the Academy without a large number of teachers and associates, and the building was badly damaged on six occasions. One of the "holes" in the wall between the concert hall and the hallway, was inscribed and preserved the Academy's management, as a symbol of these difficult times. A large number of students left Sarajevo. Out of 45 permanently hired teachers and assistants at the Academy, only fifteen remained. The Academy has lost two-thirds of the collective. The only staff were teachers from other institutions that had been hired from time to time, and the number of students was about 50. Difficulties were  also reflected in the organization of the teaching itself and in the absence of a functional work space.
In spite of all that, the training was interrupted only once for a short time, in May 1995, due to a more intensive bombing. Teachers of the instrumental sections often held classes in their own apartments due to the unsuccessful working space, but also the safety. Regardless of the difficult circumstances of life and work, the rest of the Academy has preserved human and professional enthusiasm. Apart from the efforts to preserve the teaching process, the Academy's teachers played a major role in establishing the Orchestra of the Armed Forces of Bosnia and Herzegovina, restarting the work of the Sarajevo Philharmonic, and the academic choir "Gaudeamus". Thanks to efforts from then dean, Osman-Faruk Sijarić, significant support and assistance from music academies and conservatories from Vienna, Bern, Graz, Karlsruhe, Madrid, Stockholm, was given and the Sarajevo Music Academy was registered unanonimuosly in the membership of the European Association of Music Conservatories and Academies (European Association of Conservatoires). In the war period, 15 students graduated (BA), 2 graduated (MA) and one doctorate (PhD) was defended at the Academy. With huge difficulty, the Academy accomplished its basic function for almost the last decade of the 20th century.

In more than 62 years of existence and work of the Academy, there graduated over 2700 students, mastered them around 300, and about 30 doctorates were defended. About 300 teachers and associates were taking care about everything. Regardless of the great political, social and any other turbulence that strongly influenced all aspects of existence and work, the Academy had an upward developmental line. Today it is an internationally recognizable artistic and educational institution with developed departments, academic degrees, expressed artistic and scientific activities.

Departments 
The Academy has eight Departments, one Institute of Musicology and one Center of Music Education:

Department of Composition and Electronic music
Department of Conducting
Department of Solo-Singing
Department of Piano, Harp and Percussion
Department of String Instruments
Department of Wind Instruments and Accordion
Department of Musicology and Ethnomusicology
Department of Music Theory and Pedagogy
Institute of Musicology
Center of Music Education

Degree Programs
Educational process at the Sarajevo Music Academy is carried out in three cycles of study:
The Bachelor's program (BA) lasts four years carrying 240 ECTS credits
The Master's program (MA) lasts one year carrying 60 ECTS credits
The Doctoral program (PhD) and Doctor of musical arts (DMA) lasts three years carrying 180 ECTS credits

Music Festivals at the Sarajevo Music Academy
Sarajevo Music Academy  participates in organization of following music festivals:

Majske Muzičke Svečanosti
Sarajevo Chamber Music Festival
Sonemus Fest
Sarajevo International Guitar Festival
INSAM Institute for Contemporary Artistic Music

Ensembles, Choir and Orchestra of Sarajevo Music Academy

String Orchestra
Mixed Choir
Female Choir
Symphony Orchestra
Ansambl Etnoakademik

Alumni & Past Achievements
The Academy has over 2,500 graduates, more than 200 Master of Arts and Music Sciences, 20 Doctors of Music Sciences and 5 Doctor of Musical Arts. It also publishes the monthly student music magazine "Music".

List of Former Deans
Academic Cvjetko Rihtman, ethnomusicologist and composer (1955–1959)
Miroslav Špiler, composer (1959–1963) 
Matusja Blum, piano pedagogy (1963–1967) 
Academic Teodor Romanić, conductor (1967–1972)  
Matusja Blum, piano pedagogy (1972–1976) 
mr. Zdravko Verunica, music theorist (1976–1981) 
dr. Zija Kučukalić, musicologist (1981–1983)  
mr. Milica Šnajder, pianist (1983–1985)
mr. Dunja Rihtman-Šotrić, ethnomusicologist (1985–1987) 
mr. Osman-Faruk Sijarić, violinist (1987–2003) 
dr. Selma Ferović, music theorist (2003–2007)
dr. Ivan Čavlović, music theorist (2007–2016)
dr. Senad Kazić, music theorist (2016–2020)

See also
 University of Sarajevo
 Academy of Fine Arts Sarajevo
 Academy of Performing Arts in Sarajevo
 List of university and college schools of music
 European Association of Conservatoires
 INSAM Institute for Contemporary Artistic Music
 Sonemus Fest
 Sarajevo International Guitar Festival

References

Muzička akademija Univerziteta u Sarajevu

Music
Music schools in Bosnia and Herzegovina
Educational institutions established in 1955
1955 establishments in Bosnia and Herzegovina
Performing arts in Bosnia and Herzegovina
College and university associations and consortia in Europe